Aili Siiskonen (9 February 1907 in Mikkeli – 15 January 1983) was a Finnish journalist, civil servant and politician. She was a member of the Parliament of Finland from 1958 to 1962 and from 1966 to 1970. She was at first a member of the Social Democratic Party of Finland (SDP) and later of the Social Democratic Union of Workers and Smallholders (TPSL).

References

1907 births
1983 deaths
People from Mikkeli
People from Mikkeli Province (Grand Duchy of Finland)
Social Democratic Party of Finland politicians
Social Democratic Union of Workers and Smallholders politicians
Members of the Parliament of Finland (1958–62)
Members of the Parliament of Finland (1966–70)
20th-century Finnish women politicians
Women members of the Parliament of Finland